Raphael Zaborovsky ((secular name: Mikhail; 1677 – 22 October 1747) was Bishop of Pskov and Narva and the metropolitan bishop of Kyiv in the Russian Orthodox Church.

Zaborovsky was born in Zborów in the Ruthenian Voivodeship of the Polish–Lithuanian Commonwealth. He studied at the Kyiv-Mogila Academy and then at the Moscow Theological Academy, where he later taught rhetoric (1718). After serving as a chaplain in the Russian navy he became archimandrite of the Tver Monastery. In 1723, he became a member of the church's Holy Synod.

In 1725, he was consecrated bishop of Pskov. He was elevated to the office of archbishop of Kyiv by the tsar in 1731. He later convinced the church authorities to restore the archeparchy of Kyiv to metropolis status, whereupon he took the title of ‘Metropolitan of Kyiv, Galich and Little Russia’ in 1743.

A supporter of Archbishop Theofan Prokopovich, Zaborovsky carried out the Russian government's policy of destroying the autonomy of the Ukrainian church by instituting the "Dukhovnyi reglament" of 1721 and other synodal ukases. He did, however, raise the academic standards and improve the economic standing of the Kyiv-Mohyla Academy. He published a new statute for the academy, reformed the curriculum (adding new courses in more modern disciplines), and provided much money for the expansion of the academy's buildings and for scholarships for poor students. The academy even briefly became known as the Mohyla-Zaborovsky Academy. The Great Bell Tower of the Kyiv Monastery of the Caves (1736–45), the bell tower of the Saint Sophia Cathedral, the baroque Zaborovsky Gate, and a number of other buildings were constructed during his tenure as metropolitan.  He died in Kyiv.

References 
 Zaborovsky, Rafail at the Encyclopedia of Ukraine

First Hierarchs of the Ukrainian Orthodox Church (Moscow Patriarchate)
1747 deaths
National University of Kyiv-Mohyla Academy alumni
Academic staff of the National University of Kyiv-Mohyla Academy
Ruthenian nobility
1677 births
People from Zboriv
People from Ruthenian Voivodeship